WQEL (92.7 FM) is a radio station broadcasting a classic rock format. Licensed to Bucyrus, Ohio, United States, the station serves the Mid-Ohio area.  The station is currently owned by the Bucyrus Radio Group subsidiary of Saga Communications under licensee Franklin Communications and features programming from United Stations Radio Networks and Westwood One.

History
92.7 FM went on the air in 1964 as WBCO-FM, the sister station to WBCO.  WBCO was founded in 1962 by Thomas P. & J. LaVonne Moore and Orville J. Sather as Brokensword Broadcasting Co.  When the Moores and Sathers bought out the investors, it became Sa-Mor Stations. Full ownership was assumed by Tom and LaVonne following Orville's death.  The stations were sold to Mike and Donna Laipply in 2001. the station was purchased by Scantland Broadcasting, then purchased by current Saga Communications.

The station was assigned call sign WBCQ on October 26, 1978.  On August 16, 1987, the station changed its call sign to the current WQEL.

Previous logo
  (WQEL's logo under previous classic hits format)

References

External links

QEL
Classic rock radio stations in the United States